Claremont is an unincorporated community in Sumter County, in the U.S. state of South Carolina.

History
According to tradition, Claremont was so named from the views overlooking the elevated town site.

References

Unincorporated communities in South Carolina
Unincorporated communities in Sumter County, South Carolina